Matthew Spoors (born 6 May 1999) is a cricketer who plays for the Canada national team. He made his international debut for Canada in February 2022, and made the highest score in a Twenty20 International (T20I) match for a player on his debut.

Career
Born in Australia to an Australian father and a Canadian mother, Spoors qualified to play for Canada as a dual citizen. He was awarded with a rookie contract with Western Australia ahead of the 2017/18 season, and he also represented the Australia national under-19 cricket team.

In February 2022, he was named in Canada's T20I squad for the 2022 ICC Men's T20 World Cup Global Qualifier A tournament in Oman. He made his T20I debut on 18 February 2022, for Canada against the Philippines. In the match he scored his first century in T20I cricket, with an unbeaten 108 runs. It was the highest individual total made by a cricketer on his T20I debut.

In July 2022, Spoors was named in Canada's squad for the 2022 Canada Cricket World Cup Challenge League A tournament. He made his List A debut on 27 July 2022, for Canada against Denmark.

References

1999 births
Living people
Australian cricketers
Canadian cricketers
Canada Twenty20 International cricketers
Cricketers from Melbourne